Máximo Cajal López (February 17, 1935 – April 3, 2014) was a Spanish diplomat and ambassador.

López was born in Madrid.  He was the Spanish ambassador to Guatemala in 1980 and was one of the two survivors of the burning of the Spanish Embassy (the other being Guatemalan lawyer Mario Aguirre Godoy). He was also ambassador to Sweden and France as well as Permanent Representative of Spain to NATO.

He was also the special representative of the Spanish Prime Minister, José Luis Rodríguez Zapatero, in the Alliance of Civilizations.

He died on April 3, 2014 in Madrid.

Works

References

External links 
Short biography at the FRIDE site

1935 births
2014 deaths
Ambassadors of Spain to France
Ambassadors of Spain to Guatemala
Ambassadors of Spain to Sweden
Permanent Representatives of Spain to NATO